George Richard Pickett FRS (born 1939) is Professor of Low Temperature Physics at Lancaster University.

Life
Pickett was born in 1939 and educated at Bedford Modern School and Magdalen College, Oxford (BA 1962; DPhil).

Pickett was a Lecturer, Senior Lecturer, Reader and then Head of the Department of Physics at Lancaster University.  In the 1996 Nobel Prize citation of physicist David Lee, credit was given to Pickett and his research group for their work on 3He.

In 1988, Pickett was elected a member of the Finnish Academy of Science and Letters.  In 1997 he was elected a Fellow of the Royal Society and in 2006 a foreign member of the Russian Academy of Sciences. In 1998 he was awarded the Simon Memorial Prize.

References

Fellows of the Royal Society
1939 births
Academics of Lancaster University
British physicists
Alumni of Magdalen College, Oxford
People educated at Bedford Modern School
Foreign Members of the Russian Academy of Sciences
Living people